Child laundering is a scheme whereby intercountry adoptions are effected by illegal and fraudulent means. It may involve the trafficking of children and the acquisition of children through payment, deceit and/or force. The children may then be held in sham orphanages while formal international adoption processes are used to send the children to adoptive parents in another country.

Child laundering rings are often large with multiple hierarchies of people motivated by the large profits from the black markets of intercountry adoptions. With Westerners willing to spend thousands of dollars to adopt a child, there is enough monetary incentive to extend the laundering ring from the middle classes to societies' more affluent groups. These "baby broker" families subsequently forge a new identity for the laundered child, "validating" the child's legal status as an orphan and ensuring the scheme will not be uncovered.

Child laundering is highly controversial; while many argue that these children are being treated as a commodity and stripped of family contact, others argue that, ultimately, the children will live in a more affluent environment and have more opportunities as a result of this adoption.

Hierarchy of involvement
There is a complex hierarchy within the child laundering business which includes governments, orphanages, intermediaries, birth families, and adoptive families. The people who oversee these child laundering rings are estimated to make $2,000 to $20,000 per overseas adoption. Therefore, it is advantageous for these individuals to have the necessary language and social skills in order to work closely with Western adoption agencies. Intermediaries are crucial in acquiring the child, because their job is to locate extremely impoverished parents who may be willing to sell their children out of necessity. Often, the people involved in recruiting and managing the adoption ring are local middle or upper class citizens, and they often have a negative view of the very poor. Therefore, recruiters can rationalize taking these children from the biological family on the grounds that the child will be better reared in the West. Many members of foreign governments are bribed to hasten these illegitimate adoptions, and also to ignore the illegality of these criminal organizations.

Process of illegal adoptions
Illegal child laundering adoptions involve a hierarchy of people as described above, who manipulate the legal adoptions system in order to profit. This process begins when recruiters gain physical custody of children through various means. Then, children are often taken to orphanages which arrange the adoptions, where they are sometimes severely mistreated. Finally, after a forgery of documents to falsify a child's identity, the child is sent to the West to be united with his or her adoptive parents.

Child acquisition
There are several different ways by which "orphans" are acquired and later sold within the adoption system. Parent nations are almost always poor, and in most places, these countries also have a system where impoverished parents can temporarily care for their children by placing them in orphanages, hostels or schools. This community provides poor children with care, housing, and food until the family is in a better economic situation. In these cases, parents may have no intention to sever their parental rights or abandon their children. However, these institutions may take advantage of the child and family's economic and social vulnerability to illegally profit by making the child available to overseas adoption markets, netting orphanage owners thousands of dollars per child. Another instance where children are wrongly deemed orphans is when said children become lost or separated from their families. Although institutions are required by law to make an effort to locate the family, there is virtually no way to assess whether they actually do this. If these initial efforts to locate the family fail, or are declared as failures, the institution then has the opportunity to capitalize on this by putting the child up for adoption. Another way in which "orphans" are acquired is through an outright purchase of the child. The recruiters for these adoption rings seek out poor, pregnant women and offer to pay for their child. These parents may be led to believe that they will be kept in contact with the child and receive financial support from the adoptive parents. Likewise, they may be told that they will eventually be able to migrate to live with their child once he/she is grown, presumably in a more economically developed nation. Through these methods and more, recruiters lead the birth parents to believe they are providing a better future for their child.

Treatment of children in orphanages
Investigations by United States ICE agents have indicated that the conditions in many foreign orphanages involved in child laundering are inhumane. One investigation found that the children were unwashed and unclothed, unprotected from malaria, and lying in rusty cribs (Smolin: Child Laundering 139). Additionally, there was no experienced nurse caring for the children, and the investigator termed it a "stash house". With the thousands of dollars that these orphanages receive for each adoption, the conditions children are kept in could be vastly improved for just a fraction of the racketeers' profits.

Intercountry adoption
The United States is responsible for most intercountry adoptions in the world: 20,000 out of the total 30,000 total "orphans" adopted annually. The Westerners who adopt from developing nations pay thousands of dollars to process the paperwork of one child. This provides a lucrative incentive for those involved in the process. In many cases, the prospective adoptive parents are motivated by a sense of altruism, coupled with their desire to overcome infertility and fulfill the Western standard of the nuclear family. These adoptive parents create a demand for healthy infants that will be able to assimilate into their new home, cutting off ties to their birthplace and culture of origin. Prospective adoptive parents are placed with the "orphans" through adoption agencies, brokers, or online agencies. Due to the fact that most of the children adopted overseas are very young, they will not have any memories of their birth families. Without a paper trail and without any input from the child, it makes it nearly impossible to detect whether a child is truly an orphan.

International legislation

Hague Adoption Convention
The Hague Adoption Convention has been widely adopted to regulate international adoptions. The Convention seeks to establish certain rules for international adoptions to combat child laundering. It seeks to establish an indirect solution to abuses. However, the Hague Convention fails to require any effort to preserve the family before turning to international adoption, and therefore the Convention mostly represents an anti-trafficking treaty. In 2000, the U.S. Congress enacted the Intercountry Adoption Act in order to implement the ideas of the Hague Convention. However, this Act is limited in the fact that the United States cannot enforce any measures against the sending country if corruption in the adoption process is discovered.

Stance of the United States
The US State Department does not consider child laundering to be a form of human trafficking, as it is a non-exploitative result. Furthermore, it is sometimes seen as a humanitarian act, regardless of the circumstances surrounding the acquisition of the child. The adoption agencies in the West are operating within a completely legitimate sphere, and have no way of knowing whether they are a party to this human rights violation. Therefore, the United States does not have the jurisdiction to prosecute these agencies working in the developing countries. However, the Department of State does caution that international adoption should be considered when it is in the best interest of a child and domestic adoption options have already been evaluated.

Case studies
Child laundering is a global issue, and there have been highly publicized cases in the past decade. Guatemala, China, and Cambodia highly exemplify the problems associated with intercountry adoptions.

Guatemala
From 1999–2011 there have been:
 29,731 adoptions of Guatemalan children
 15,691 females and 14,040 males
 20,829 children aged under 1 year
 6,557 children aged 1–2 years
 2,749 children aged 3–18 years
Before Guatemala's adoption of the Hague Convention in 2007, child laundering was a widespread and notorious issue in Guatemala. The recruiters are called jaladoras or buscadoras, and these individuals often work with medical personnel who give the recruiters information about where vulnerable women can be located. For every child procured, the buscadora earns anywhere from $5,000 to $8,000. Some of the methods included women being told their baby did not survive childbirth, or the outright purchase of a child. These women never received much in compensation for their child, as most of the bribes went to the "baby brokers" who process most of the paperwork in the adoption process. Since signing of the Hague Convention, new laws were passed by Guatemala to create new standards for the adoptions process. All adoption agencies have to be accredited and be accountable for their actions, as well as keep detailed and accurate financial records. Additionally, foster care now has much more accountability to the oversight of the Secretaria de Binestar Social (SBS). The Central Authority (CA) was also established in order to ensure Guatemala's compliance with Hague Convention rules; children who have been legally approved for adoptions (by a judge) are matched with a prospective adoptive family by a team made up of a CA social worker and a psychologist. Following the restructuring of the Guatemalan government, Guatemala ceased all foreign adoptions. In 2011, the government announced that authorities would be reviewing cases that had been in the works in 2007, but they would not be accepting any more cases. As of 2011, the United States was no longer processing adoptions from Guatemala, joining the ranks of  other countries who had placed moratoriums on Guatemalan adoptions.

China
From 1999–2011 there have been:
 66,630 adoptions of Chinese children
 60,431 females and 6,199 males
 25,605 children aged under 1 year
 33,566 children aged 1–2 years
 6,904 children aged 3–18 years
China has experienced rampant child laundering in past decades, although now it is considered to be better regulated than most other sending countries. China reports about 10,000 kidnappings or abductions a year, although the true numbers are considered by demographers to be much higher. The official statistics are only based on those cases which have been resolved, but it is very difficult to prove that any individual child has been kidnapped and then laundered. Most of these children are from poor families in the rural areas, taken as a result of the profits to be made from Western adoptive families. The Hunan adoption scandal brought many of these issues to light, as orphanages were sending  intermediaries into rural areas to acquire children, who were then moved around Hunan and given fraudulent documents in order to cover up their illicit origins. Some argue that the issue of child laundering in China stems from the one-child policy, which created what was once a surplus of children needing adoption. However, since the demand for Chinese children has increased, institutions have resorted to methods like kidnapping in order to meet customer demand and maintain profitability. This logic has been criticized on the grounds that that the system of international adoptions has, in fact, created a mechanism whereby poor families in China are exploited in order to feed   the Western demand for Chinese children. This view holds that Western ethnocentric justifications for these behaviors falsely imply that the child will have a better life in the West without any connection to the biological family.

Cambodia
From 1999–2011 there have been:
 2,355 adoptions of Cambodian children
 1,369 females and 986 males
 1,370 children aged under 1 year
 677 children aged 1–2 years
 308 children aged 3–18 
While most instances of intercountry adoption take two or more years to process, Cambodia has made a policy of expediting this process, often in as few as three months. Human rights activists consider Cambodia to be one of the countries with the most corruption involved in intercountry adoption. LICADHO, a Cambodian human rights group, has expressed that recruiters target poor families and women in their efforts to gain access to young children. Tactics such as the outright purchase of babies for as little as US$20 or deception of birthparents into relinquishing physical custody are systematically employed. One particular case that gained media attention focused on a child laundering scheme run by an American woman named Lauryn Galindo. Galindo was prosecuted in the United States and convicted of "material misrepresentations as to the orphan status and identities" of infant adoptees over the period of 1997 through 2001. Galindo was sentenced to 18 months in prison, a fine, and required community service. Currently, the United States, formerly one of the most common destinations for Cambodian adoptees, no longer processes adoptions from Cambodia.

Sri Lanka 
In the period of 1970 to 2017, 11,000 babies from Sri Lanka were exported to Western Countries, mainly those in Europe, including The Netherlands, Sweden, Switzerland and Germany. The Netherlands received the most children, including over 4,000 babies. Due to poverty and other social and cultural problems, many Sri Lankan families were forced to give up their children for adoption. Adoption agencies and certain notable people were identified as intermediaries in the adoption process. As the demand was high, many adoption agencies and the intermediates associated with them started "baby farms" where birth mothers and stolen infants were held. Many hospitals in Sri Lanka, especially those in districts like Ratnapura District, Galle District, Kandy District, Colombo District, Kegalle District and Kalutara District, either stole infants or coerced birth mothers into putting their children up for adoption. Government officials, tour guides, lawyers, and medical staff have all been implicated in unethical international adoption scandals. The babies were bought from mothers for around $30 by intermediates and sold to foreign couples for double the amount. After the year 2000, many babies who were adopted out of the country returned to Sri Lanka to meet their biological parents, to find that the documents used in their adoptions had been falsified and the biological parents they had hoped to meet were not real. In 2017, after the Dutch TV program Zembla revealed the adoption fraud, both the Dutch and Sri Lankan governments opened investigations, during which the Sri Lankan Government admitted that the baby farms were present. Many additional adoptees have since gone in front of the Court to ask for investigations about their adoptions.

See also
 Child-selling
 Hague Convention on the Civil Aspects of International Child Abduction
 Hague Convention on Protection of Children and Co-operation in Respect of Intercountry Adoption
 International adoption
 List of international adoption scandals
 Trafficking of children

Notes

References
 Smolin, David. "Child Laundering and the Hague Convention on Intercountry Adoption: The Future and Past of Intercountry Adoption." 'University of Louisville Law Review.' Volume 48, No. 3, 2010,' p. 448, 452
 Smolin, David. "How the Intercountry Adoption System Legitimizes and Incentivizes the Practices of Buying, Trafficking, Kidnapping, and Stealing Children." Cumberland Law Review. 2005.
 Petit, Juan Miguel. "Rights of the Child." United Nations: Economic and Social Council Commission on Human Rights. 6 January 2003.
 "Issues in Adoption Viewpoints." ed. William Dudley. Detroit: Greenhaven Press. 2004, p. 66
 Allen, Kevin Minh. "The Price We All Pay: Human Trafficking in International Adoption." Conducive Magazine: 6 October 2009, p. 10; "Issues in Adoption Viewpoints." ed. William Dudley. Detroit: Greenhaven Press. 2004, p. 70
Mansnerus, Laura. "Market Puts Price Tags on the Priceless." New York Times. 26 October 1998, p. 2
Mezmur, Benyam D. "'The Sins of the 'Saviors: Child Trafficking in the Context of Intercountry Adoption in Africa." Permanent Bureau. June 2010, p. 6
Meier, Patricia J. and Xiaole Zhang. "Sold into Adoption: The Hunan Baby Trafficking Scandal Exposes Vulnerabilities in Chinese Adoptions to the United States." Cumberland Law Review, Vol. 39, No. 1. 25 Oct 2008
 US Department of State: Intercountry Adoption Statistics. http://adoption.state.gov/about_us/statistics.php
 Rotabi, Karen Smith and Kelley Bunkers. "Intercountry Adoption Reform Based on the Hague Convention on Intercountry Adoption: An Update on Guatemala in 2008."
  
 Hoffman, Meredith. "Amid Allegations of Human Trafficking, Guatemala to Review Adoptions." New America Media. 24 August 2011
 Custer, Charles. "China's Missing Children." Foreign Policy Magazine. 10 October 2011
 Smith-Gary, Laura. "International Adoptions Fuel 'Family Planning' Kidnappings." Equal Writes, Feminism and Gender Issues at Princeton University. 5 October 2009
 Baker, Mark. "Babies for sale: no warranty." Sydney Morning Herald. 13 December 2003
 "Hawaii Resident Sentenced to 18 months in Prison in Cambodian Adoption Conspiracy." US Department of Justice, US Attorney, Western District of Washington. 19 November 2004

Human trafficking
Crimes against humanity
Organized crime activity
Crimes against children